Rowe may refer to:

Places
Rowe, Massachusetts, U.S.
Rowe, New Mexico, U.S.
Rowes Bay, Queensland, a suburb of Townsville Australia
Rowe, now Rówek, Poland

Other
Rowe (surname)
Rowe (musician), solo project of Becky Louise Filip, former member of The Honey Trees
ROWE, Results-Only Work Environment
USS Rowe (DD-564), naval destroyer
ROWE Mineralölwerk, a German lubricant manufacturer
Rowe Racing, a German auto racing team

See also
Mount Rowe, a small mountain in New Hampshire
Row (disambiguation)
Roe (disambiguation)
Wroe (disambiguation)